Exequiel Bellaflor Javier (born October 16, 1946) is a Filipino politician. He has been elected to six terms as a Member of the House of Representatives, representing the Lone District of Antique from 1987 to 1998, and from 2001 to 2010. He has also served as the governor of the province of Antique.

A graduate of the Ateneo de Manila Law School, Javier is the younger brother of Antique governor Evelio Javier, a political ally of Corazon Aquino who was assassinated during Aquino's presidential campaign in 1986. Javier himself was elected to one term as Antique governor, serving from 1998 to 2001. In three successive elections, his foe Arturo Pacificador tried to gain back his seat he had lost when he was ousted in the People Power Revolution, but lost.

On February 3, 2015, Javier was formally removed from office by the Department of the Interior and Local Government (DILG) and Commission on Elections (Comelec)  for violating the Omnibus Election Code when he ordered the suspension of Mayor Mary Joyce Roquero, of Valderrama town in Antique, during the 2013 election period.

References

 
 
 

.

1946 births
Karay-a people
Living people
Governors of Antique (province)
Lakas–CMD politicians
Members of the House of Representatives of the Philippines from Antique (province)
20th-century Filipino lawyers
People from Antique (province)
Ateneo de Manila University alumni